John Brewster may refer to:

John Brewster (author) (1753–1842), English author and clergyman
John Brewster Jr. (1766–1854), American painter
John William Brewster (1930–2019), British politician
John Brewster (musician) (born 1949), Australian guitarist
John Alexander Brewster (1826–1889), California Surveyor General

See also
Jonathan Brewster (1593–1659), early American settler